Leora Dana (April 1, 1923 – December 13, 1983) was an American film, stage and television actress.

Education
Dana was born in New York City and her elder sister was Doris Dana. Dana graduated from Barnard College and the Royal Academy of Dramatic Art.

Stage
In 1947, Dana made her stage debut in London. In 1948, she debuted on Broadway in The Madwoman of Chaillot.

Film
After appearing in the 1957 western 3:10 to Yuma with Van Heflin and Glenn Ford, Dana had supporting roles in two 1958 Frank Sinatra films; Kings Go Forth and Some Came Running. Her other film credits included Pollyanna (1960), A Gathering of Eagles (1963), The Group (1966), The Boston Strangler (1968), Change of Habit (1969), Tora! Tora! Tora! (1970), Wild Rovers (1971), Shoot the Moon (1982), Baby It's You (1983), and Amityville 3-D (1983). Dana also played Anne Fry, the wife of the patriot John Fry, played by Jack Lord in the 1957 Paramount Pictures orientation film for Colonial Williamsburg, Williamsburg: The Story of a Patriot. The film has the distinction of being the longest-running motion picture in history, having been shown continually in the Colonial Williamsburg Visitor Center for over five decades.

Television
Dana guest-starred in three episodes of the television series Alfred Hitchcock Presents. In 1961, Dana appeared in an episode ("The Scott Machine") of the television series The Asphalt Jungle, and later appeared in the 1977 miniseries Seventh Avenue. In 1978–1979, Dana played the role of alcoholic clothing designer Sylvie Kosloff, the biological mother of villainess Iris Cory (Beverlee McKinsey) on the NBC daytime soap opera Another World.

Awards
Dana won the Tony Award for Best Performance by a Featured Actress in a Play in 1973 for The Last of Mrs. Lincoln and the Clarence Derwent Award for her work in The Madwoman of Chaillot.

Death
Dana died of cancer, aged 60, December 13, 1983 in New York City..

Filmography

Film

Television

Radio appearances

References

External links
 
 
 
 Leora Dana at the University of Wisconsin's Actors Studio audio collection

1923 births
1983 deaths
20th-century American actresses
Actors Studio alumni
Actresses from New York City
Alumni of RADA
American film actresses
American stage actresses
American television actresses
Barnard College alumni
Deaths from cancer in New York (state)
Tony Award winners
American expatriates in England